Michael Anton Biermer (18 October 1827 – 15 October 1892) was a German internist who was a native of Bamberg.

In 1851 he earned his doctorate from the University of Würzburg, where he was a student of Rudolf Virchow. Later he was a professor at Bern (from 1861), Zurich (from 1867) and Breslau (1874–91). Two of his better known students were surgeon Theodor Kocher (1841-1917) in Zurich, and dermatologist Albert Neisser (1855-1916) in Breslau.

In 1860 Biermer was the first to describe a patient with acute lymphoblastic leukemia, 5-year old Maria Speyer. In 1872 he described a disorder he called "progressive pernicious anemia". He wrote about the disease in an article titled Über eine eigentümliche Form von progressiver, perniciöser Anaemie. He called it "pernicious anemia" because of the disease's insidious course, and because it was deemed to be untreatable at the time. In 1849, Thomas Addison described the same disease, however Biermer's description was much more comprehensive. Historically, pernicious anemia has also been called "Addison-Biermer disease".

His name is also associated with a medical percussion phenomenon known as "Biermer's change of note".

References
 Michael Anton Biermer @ Who Named It

1827 births
1892 deaths
German internists
Academic staff of the University of Breslau
People from Bamberg
Academic staff of the University of Zurich
Academic staff of the University of Bern